Lua' may refer to:
 Lua' people, an ethnic group of Laos and Thailand
 Lua' languages, encompassing the closely related Prai and Mal languages

See also 
 Lua (disambiguation)

Language and nationality disambiguation pages